Marco Kurz (born 16 May 1969) is a German football manager and former player who played as a defender. He last managed Australian side Melbourne Victory.

Playing career

Kurz, who played as a defender, started playing football at SV Sillenbuch, a small club in his native Stuttgart, and then for VfL Sindelfingen. At age 20, he had his breakthrough into professional football, when he signed a contract for his local Bundesliga side VfB Stuttgart in the summer of 1989. After one year, where he—with the exception of one cap—only played for VfB's second team, he was transferred to 1. FC Nürnberg in 1990; there he was more successful, earning 108 caps in four seasons. When the team was relegated to the 2. Bundesliga after the 1993–94 season, Kurz took up an offer by Borussia Dortmund. Dortmund won the title of German champion in the following season, with Kurz playing four times. 

At rival club Schalke 04, where Kurz subsequently played from 1995 to 1998, he earned 58 caps. With Schalke he won his biggest title, the 1996–97 UEFA Cup, under coach Huub Stevens. In 1998, he transferred to the south of Germany again, joining TSV 1860 Munich. He played 128 times for 1860 Munich until 2004, when the club was relegated to the 2. Bundesliga.

2004–05 was Kurz's last season as a player. He spent it at SC Pfullendorf, a Regionalliga Süd (then third division) team (11 caps). Shortly after joining Pfullendorf, he was promoted to player-coach; in 2005, he retired as a player, but stayed at Pfullendorf as head coach.

Managerial career

After managing SC Pfullendorf, Kurz returned to 1860 Munich as a manager for the second team (Regionalliga Süd). In March 2007, he was promoted to head coach of the first team. 1860 Munich sacked Kurz in February 2009. 

Kurz joined 1. FC Kaiserslautern in June 2009. He won promotion to the Bundesliga for the club in 2010. The subsequent 2010–11 season was changeable and most of the time, FCK was threatened by relegation, but eventually they finished a sensational seventh in the German top flight—their best finish in the bundesliga since 1998–99, when they finished fifth. 2011–12 was much worse, with Kaiserslautern occupying a relegation berth virtually all season. As a result, Kaiserslautern parted ways with coach Kurz on 20 March 2012.

On 18 December 2012, it was announced by Bundesliga side 1899 Hoffenheim that Kurz would be the new head coach for the second half of the 2012–13 season, when Hoffenheim faced the threat of relegation. Hoffenheim were not able to emerge from the drop zone and decided to fire Kurz on 2 April 2013. Then, Kurz was manager of Ingolstadt 04 between 9 June 2013 and 30 September 2013.

He was named the head coach of Fortuna Düsseldorf on 23 December 2015. After scoring four points in seven games, Kurz was sacked on 13 March 2016.

On 16 June 2017, Kurz was appointed head coach of A-League club Adelaide United. He won his first competitive match as manager for Adelaide United on 9 August 2017 in the round of 32 of the FFA Cup defeating the Newcastle Jets 1–0. He made his A-League managerial debut on 8 October 2017 against Wellington Phoenix with the result being a draw at 1–1. Kurz helped Adelaide reach the final of the 2017 FFA Cup against Sydney FC on 21 November 2017 after defeating Western Sydney Wanderers 2–1 in the semi-finals; they went on to lose 1–2 after extra time. In 2018, Kurz led Adelaide United to their second FFA Cup triumph, defeating Sydney FC 2–1.

On 28 June 2019, Kurz was appointed manager of A-League side Melbourne Victory on a two-year deal, after their previous manager, Kevin Muscat, stepped down. 

In January 2020, after six months in the role, Kurz was dismissed by Melbourne Victory; this was the third-fastest coaching dismissal in A-League history. Kurz left having managed the Victory for just 13 matches, for four wins, three draws and six losses; the six defeats were the most losses the Victory had suffered after 13 games of a season. At the time of his dismissal, Victory were sixth in the league with 15 points, their equal-lowest points tally after 13 games alongside the 2007–08 and 2011–12 seasons. He was replaced by Victory assistant coach Carlos Pérez Salvachúa.

Managerial statistics

Honours

Player
Borussia Dortmund
Bundesliga: 1994–95
DFL-Supercup: 1995

Schalke 04
UEFA Cup: 1996–97

Manager
1. FC Kaiserslautern
2. Bundesliga: 2009–10

Adelaide United
FFA Cup: 2018

References

External links

1969 births
Living people
Footballers from Stuttgart
German footballers
Association football defenders
VfB Stuttgart players
1. FC Nürnberg players
Borussia Dortmund players
FC Schalke 04 players
TSV 1860 Munich players
SC Pfullendorf players
Bundesliga players
UEFA Cup winning players
German football managers
TSV 1860 Munich managers
1. FC Kaiserslautern managers
TSG 1899 Hoffenheim managers
FC Ingolstadt 04 managers
Fortuna Düsseldorf managers
Adelaide United FC managers
Melbourne Victory FC managers
Bundesliga managers
2. Bundesliga managers
A-League Men managers
German expatriate football managers
German expatriate sportspeople in Australia
Expatriate soccer managers in Australia
West German footballers